Trina Colette McGee (formerly known as Trina McGee-Davis) is an American actress best known for her portrayal of Angela Moore on the ABC-TV sitcom Boy Meets World.

Early life
Born and raised in the Bronx, New York, McGee is of Haitian descent. She attended Howard University in Washington, D.C. for a time.

Career
After appearing in minor film roles and guest-starring in various sitcoms, McGee landed her first recurring TV role as Angela Moore in Boy Meets World in 1997. Angela's interracial relationship with Shawn Hunter (played by Rider Strong, to whom McGee is 10 years senior) was unusual for a major network television show at the time, especially one whose target demographic was teenagers. She once remarked that the typical reaction she received from young fans regarding the relationship was overwhelmingly positive and encouraging, often inquiring as to when the characters might reconcile after a breakup. She expressed her personal wish that the relationship would serve as an example of color blindness for the world. In 2015 she reprised the role in one episode for the sequel series Girl Meets World.

In June 2020, McGee did an interview with Yahoo Entertainment where she stated that she experienced racism while starring on Boy Meets World. She stated that the stars she had incidents with were Will Friedle and Danielle Fishel. She said that she has since made amends with Friedle and Fishel.

Filmography

In acting roles

Film

Television

As writer, director, or producer

References

External links 

American film actresses
American people of Haitian descent
Actresses of Haitian descent
African-American actresses
Living people
American television actresses
People from the Bronx
Actresses from New York City
21st-century African-American people
21st-century African-American women
20th-century African-American people
20th-century African-American women
Year of birth missing (living people)